The Robinson Historic District encompasses the oldest residential neighborhood of Conway, Arkansas.  It is located just west of the city's downtown business district, and is bounded on the east by Faulkner Street, the south by Robinson Avenue, the west by Watkins Street, and the north by Ash, Caldwell, and Davis Streets.  It contains a cross-section of residential architectural styles covering the city's development between 1890 and 1950.  The district is named for Asa P. Robinson, Conway's founder.

The district was listed on the National Register of Historic Places in 2001.  Properties within the district that were previously listed include the Brown House, the First United Methodist Church, the O.L. Dunaway House, the Greeson-Cone House, the Harton House, and the S.G. Smith House.

See also
National Register of Historic Places listings in Faulkner County, Arkansas

References

Historic districts on the National Register of Historic Places in Arkansas
Queen Anne architecture in Arkansas
Colonial Revival architecture in Arkansas
Geography of Faulkner County, Arkansas
Conway, Arkansas